The Col du Cucheron, culminating at 1139 m above sea level, is one of the points of the long depression of the "three passes" of the Chartreuse massif linking Saint-Pierre-de-Chartreuse south to Saint-Pierre d'Entremont north.

Hence, it lies between the Grand Som west and the Lances de Malissard east.
 

Mountain passes of Auvergne-Rhône-Alpes
Mountain passes of the Alps